James or Jim Townsend may refer to:

James Townsend (New Zealand settler) (1790–1866), English cricketer, wine merchant and settler in New Zealand's South Island
James Townsend (British politician) (1737–1787), Lord Mayor of London 1772
James Townsend (New York politician) (1729–1790), U.S. Congressman-elect from New York
James Townsend (Oklahoma politician), member of the Oklahoma House of Representatives 
James Townsend (psychologist) (born 1939), mathematical psychologist
Jim Townsend (footballer) (1945–2020), Scottish footballer (Heart of Midlothian FC)
Jim Townsend (Irish politician) (1937–2021), member of the Irish Senate
Jim Townsend (Michigan politician), member of the Michigan House of Representatives
James William Emery Townsend (1838–1900), better known as Lying Jim Townsend, American storyteller
James Townsend Saward (1798–?), English forger
James Matthew Townsend (1841–1913), African Methodist Episcopal minister and state legislator from Indiana
James G. Townsend, politician in New Mexico

See also

Lord James Townshend (1785–1842), British naval commander and Tory politician